San Jerónimo District is one of the nineteen districts of the Andahuaylas Province in Peru.

Geography 
Other mountains are listed below:

Ethnic groups 
The people in the district are mainly indigenous citizens of Quechua descent. Quechua is the language which the majority of the population (69.26%) learnt to speak in childhood, 30.47% of the residents started speaking using the Spanish language (2007 Peru Census).

See also 
 Antaqucha
 Llamachayuq
 Quriqucha
 Wachuqucha

References

Districts of the Andahuaylas Province
Districts of the Apurímac Region